William H. Boole (1827 – February 24, 1896) was a pastor of the Willet Street Methodist Church in the Bowery in New York City.

Biography
He was the son of John Boole and Magdalene Jane (Ackerman) Boole, and he had a brother Francis John Ackerman Boole who ran unsuccessfully for Mayor of New York City. William married Eunice Goodwin around 1843. He ran in the New York state election, 1882 on the Prohibition Party ticket for Lieutenant Governor of New York. He declined a nomination in 1883. He married Ella Alexander on July 3, 1883.

He was a trustee and juryman for Prohibition Park on Staten Island.

He died on February 24, 1896, at his home in Prohibition Park.

References

1827 births
1896 deaths
American Methodist clergy
New York (state) Prohibitionists
19th-century Methodists
19th-century American clergy